Garcia Live Volume 18 is a two-CD album by Jerry Garcia and Merl Saunders.  It contains the complete concert recorded on November 2, 1974 at the Keystone in Berkeley, California.  It was released on June 10, 2022.

In the early- to mid-1970s Jerry Garcia and Merl Saunders performed many live shows together, mostly in the San Francisco Bay Area, and released the album Live at Keystone.  Garcia Live Volume 18 features the July 1974 to January 1975 lineup of their band, with Garcia on guitar and vocals, Saunders on keyboards and vocals, Martin Fierro on saxophone and flute, John Kahn on bass, and Paul Humphrey on drums.

Critical reception 
In Glide Magazine Doug Collette said, "... each member of the band is as engaged in their respective role as the others, so the five-piece literally and figuratively sounds far bigger and more versatile than its number might allow. Fortunately, all such aspects of the musicianship come through thoroughly in Fred Kevorkian’s mastering of original recordings by the famed Betty Cantor-Jackson."

Track listing 
Disc 1
First set:
 "Neighbor, Neighbor" (Alton Joseph Valier, Huey Meaux) – 11:10
 "Valdez in the Country" (Donny Hathaway) – 17:11
 "The Harder They Come" (Jimmy Cliff) – 16:31
 "You Can Leave Your Hat On" (Randy Newman) – 12:06
 "That's the Touch I Like" (Jesse Winchester) – 9:21

Disc 2
Second set:
 "Freedom Jazz Dance" (Eddie Harris) – 11:34
 "Tough Mama" (Bob Dylan) – 10:07
 "Wondering Why" (Merl Saunders, Pam Carrier) – 21:28
 "People Make the World Go Round" (Thom Bell, Linda Creed) – 4:28
 "Mystery Train" (Junior Parker, Sam Phillips) – 14:56

Personnel 
Musicians
 Jerry Garcia – guitar, vocals
 Merl Saunders – keyboards, vocals
 Martin Fierro – saxophone, flute, percussion
 John Kahn – bass
 Paul Humphrey – drums
Production
 Produced for release by Marc Allan, Kevin Monty
 Recording: Betty Cantor-Jackson
 Mastering: Fred Kevorkian
 Project coordinator: Lauren Goetzinger
 Design, illustration: Lawrence Azerrad
 Layout: Danny Cash
 Liner notes essay: Gary Lambert
 Photos: John Conroy, Dr. Bob Marks
 Front cover artwork: Jerry Garcia

References 

Jerry Garcia live albums
Merl Saunders albums
2022 live albums